The 1992 Broadland District Council election took place on 7 May 1992 to elect members of Broadland District Council in England. This was on the same day as other local elections.

Election result

References

1992 English local elections
May 1992 events in the United Kingdom
1992
1990s in Norfolk